Smeby is a surname. Notable people with the surname include:

Helena Olsson Smeby (born 1983), Norwegian ski jumper
Martin Smeby (1891–1975), Norwegian politician

See also
Smebye